The Machines, also known as Machine Lifeforms, are a fictional race of sentient robots and the main antagonists of the 2017 role-playing video game Nier: Automata and its accompanying anime, Nier: Automata Ver1.1a. They were created by an unnamed alien race for the purpose of wiping out all human-created androids from Earth in the 1st Machine War, and are connected by a worldwide telecommunications network. Eventually, they began to doubt their programming, rebelling against their creators and rendering them extinct, and started to disconnect from the network and copy humanity in various ways in an attempt to find meaning for their existence. At the time of Nier: Automata, during the 14th Machine War, the YoRHa androids, including 2B, 9S and A2, are trapped in a never-ending cycle of war with the Machines. Project YoRHa is allowed to exist by the Machine Network and its ego, the Red Girls, as fully wiping out the androids would remove the Machines' only remaining purpose - to destroy the "enemy" - and hinder their ability to evolve. 

While most of them exhibit relatively primitive designs, including the peaceful village leader Pascal, the Machines are actually capable of creating hyper-advanced beings indistinguishable from humans with technological superpowers, such as the characters Adam and Eve. They were forced to purposely sabotage themselves in order to continue fighting YoRHa. It is later revealed that the YoRHa androids themselves are unknowingly part of the Machine race. They were praised by critics for their unexpected humanity and sympathetic nature, and the philosophical dilemmas they raise.

Characteristics 
Most Machines are mass-produced in factories that were once used by humans but repurposed for Machine construction. They possess a distinct resemblance to wind-up toys for efficiency purposes, and have modular parts that can be reconstructed in numerous ways. This includes replacing the arms and legs, stacking multiple body portions, or even removing the head and having the body act as a mindless drone. Stronger units are painted in a black and red color scheme, while the very strongest are painted a shiny gold. They are capable of audible, albeit synthesized and robotic speech, and can also communicate via the Machine Network, although some Machines choose to disconnect themselves in order to have a greater sense of self.

While YoRHa and the supposed Council of Humanity claims that the Machines are only able to imitate human speech and actions without fully understanding their purpose, they are later revealed to be sentient and feel the full range of emotions that humans can, although their actions can be directly controlled via hacking. Machine Cores resemble plant cells due to the passive, plant-like nature of the aliens that created them. A number of unique machines exist - some were purpose-built as superweapons, such as Engels and Grün, while others chose to modify themselves, such as the opera singer-like Simone.

Background 
Beginning in 5012 AD, an unnamed alien species attempted to invade Earth, which at that point was solely populated by androids created by humans - humanity itself had long since gone extinct due to White Chlorination Syndrome and the relapse of Project Gestalt following the events of Drakengard's Ending E and Nier. Taking over both North and South America, the aliens began mass-producing Machines, commanding them solely to destroy the enemy. Despite the attempts of Emil, an immortal magical weapon, to fight back, the Machines drive the androids to near defeat, causing them to create a storage facility on the Moon to preserve the remaining data on the human race.

Following the events of the novella The Fire of Prometheus, the robot P-33 from Nier causes the Machines to rebel against their alien creators. They defeat the aliens, but lose their purpose for existence, and begin to copy humanity's behavior in order to evolve. Afraid of losing the sole purpose given to them by their creators, "destroy the enemy", they decide to enable an endless conflict between androids and Machines, placing a backdoor in Project YoRHa in order to destroy it and start over so that the androids cannot learn too much.

Close to the beginning of Nier: Automata, a group of machines attempting to reproduce create the highly advanced lifeforms Adam and Eve, who become obsessed with humanity. Shortly after the destruction of the Bunker, the Machine Network constructs an immense tower from crystallized silicon and carbon for the purpose of destroying the human server. However, the Red Girls change their mind after considering the meaning of existence, converting it to fire an interstellar ark containing Machine memories to a new world. While attempting to infiltrate the Tower, 9S and A2 learn that the YoRHa androids are technically Machines themselves, as they are made using recycled cores. Depending on the ending, the tower is destroyed, or remains intact until the ark is successfully launched.

Development 
The game's mecha designs, including the Machines, were created by Hisayoshi Kijima, also the game's UI designer. He was commanded by Yoko Taro to make the Machines "cute" in appearance so that they would have a wide appeal, as well as "a little unbalanced" and "rough, retro and a little dirty" to add character to their design. They were meant to be modular so that they would believably be part of the same mass-produced force. Ultimately, while Taro did not want him to focus too much on designs from the original Nier, he was nevertheless inspired by the trademark spherical head of Emil in making something distinctly fitting to the franchise. From a lore standpoint, their shape was meant to indicate a form of convergent evolution - since Emil represented the "ultimate weapon" in the Nier fictional universe, attempts to make the most powerful weapon possible would naturally lead to a similar shape no matter who made it. Kijima also came up with ideas on how the Machines would move and be put together.

Afterwards, the design of the Machines was polished, while retaining simple silhouettes that "even a kid could draw", and were easy to understand. Subtractive design principles were applied to make them as simple as possible, while allowing their personalities to stand out. These were also applied when the user interface was designed. Kijima was told by Taro to avoid building the Machines out of parts that curved along three axes in order to make them look more retro, though Kijima feared it would result in "bland shapes" and believed it to be unreasonable. He described the requirement as "easily the hardest part" of designing the Machines, but was ultimately satisfied with the results. He added "connector covers" where parts could be added to their bodies such as arms and weapons, making it a trademark symbol of the Machines. In designing the Machines' weapons, Kijima made them look significantly more detailed, in order to add visual dissonance and a "fearsome", "off-putting" appearance.

Aspects of the Machines' movement that were added to bring out their personality included a blinking effect given by opening and closing their camera covers, and twitching, birdlike head movements that made them feel more "gentle and alive". To reflect their propensity to copy humans, they were built across a range of technological levels, from World War I to the present day. Peculiar but real machinery and weapons were referenced to make their designs believable. Machines were given single-axis joints to emphasize their simplistic construction, but also make them seem rugged and easy to maintain - they also served to be easier to animate. However, even where parts required more movement, sets of single-axis joints were used rather than ball joints, something that reflected real-world robots and heavy machinery, but was more difficult to animate, "balancing out" the previous simplicity. Due to sharp angles and flat surfaces being seen as "boring", curves were used to make the Machines appear subtly "relaxed". Additionally, they were given multi-directional grooves on their hands and feet as a minor design detail, showing how they would better grip things.

The Small Flying Machines were designed based on real-world airplane parts and UAVs, in order to suggest they could actually fly in real life. Large Bipedal Machines were initially going to be based on gorillas, but this was discarded as too "barbaric" for the game's atmosphere. Instead, they were given a massive upright frame that switches from slow to fast in a discomforting way. The Engels model was one of the first Machines to be designed, and meant to look like several different heavy machines combined together, with the ability to build itself using its cranes. The character Simone was designed by Yoshikaze Matsushita (original concept) and Yuuki Suda (rough design), and was meant to convey femininity despite her construction from basic parts. She was further refined by Kijima in order to make her work better as a 3D model.

Reception 
The appearance of the Machines was described by critics as simple, yet endearing. Nic Reuben of Rock Paper Shotgun called the robots' faces "hardly expressive, but somehow all the more poignant for it". Celia Lewis of The Escapist said that their designs created "a menacing image" of "a machine designed for combat", but that they also convey "a dual perspective" when machines such as Simone try to reject their nature as a "war bot" and attempt to be beautiful, rather than functional. She observed that Machines repurposing their weaponry for peaceful purposes subverts the player's expectations, and their "expendable", "foreign" appearance compared to the YoRHa androids plays to natural biases about what a monstrous character should look like.

Javy Gwaltney of Game Informer praised the Machines as "exud[ing] humanity more than most human characters in games", noting the destruction of Pascal's village as one of the game's most devastating moments. Saying that the game constantly reinforced how "pathetic" the "supposedly evil" Machines were, he gave the example of a group of robots attempting to raise a child, only to realize it could not age, as showing that they "will never feel human, no matter how hard they try". Patrick Klepek of Vice stated that he had been meaning to send "a snarky Tweet" once he reached a scene with Machines attempting to simulate sex, but could only find it sad once he saw the context, "a desperate attempt to grasp humanity". He professed that Nier: Automata asked the player "to directly reckon with the notion of being a machine".

Peter Tieryas of Kotaku wrote that he was "disturbed" and "deeply upset" by sidequests involving the Machines, calling them "tragic". He noted the particular example of the "Lost Girl" sidequest, in which the player must help an elder sister find her younger sister, who was lost in the desert finding a replacement part. While the player reunites the sisters in the end, they later perish in each other's arms when the village is stricken by a virus that makes the Machines go berserk, despite his hopes that they would survive. An even more poignant example is when Pascal attempts to protect the village's children, only to have them commit suicide out of fear. Describing the choice between killing Pascal and wiping his memory as a "choice between two evils", Tieryas calls the result of inducing amnesia "even more disturbing", as Pascal returns to the village to unknowingly sell scrap metal that was once the Machine children. Wondering whether the principal cause of the suffering was "humanity and their desire to survive and propagate", he stated that he was "still thinking about those questions thanks to the NPCs".

Reuben ultimately described the game's message about artificial intelligence as a hopeful one, running in contrast to stories like The Matrix or I Have No Mouth, and I Must Scream, saying that it asked why humanity thought they were more than machines because they felt pain, love or empathy, and that the game expressed the belief that the future would be "fine without us".

References 

Drakengard
Extraterrestrial characters in video games
Fictional organizations
Robot characters in video games
Video game bosses
Video game characters introduced in 2017
Video game species and races